Studio One, currently known as The Factory, is an LGBT nightclub in West Hollywood, California.

History 
The Studio One building was originally owned by William Fox and was used as a Norden bombsight facility during World War 2.  In 1968 the building was bought another d transformed into The Factory nightclub, named after the furniture manufacturing business in the lower floor of the building. The Factory became a popular 1960s-style discothèque that was frequented by Hollywood celebrities, but it only lasted a few years. Studio One was founded on the same site in the early 1970s by part-owner Scott Forbes, a Boston optometrist. In the 1990s it was bought by Sandy Sachs and renamed to Axis. The space is currently called "The Robertson".

Throughout its history, the club has been associated with the gay rights movement. Many celebrities graced the club either as guests or performers, especially during the late 1970s and most of the 1980s. Photos of those people were displayed in the hallway between the disco and cabaret. The club also had entertainers Sammy Davis, Jr., Peter Lawford and Paul Newman on its board of directors.

Notable performers
Wayland Flowers
Madeline Kahn
Bernadette Peters
Chita Rivera
Joan Rivers
Ike & Tina Turner

See also
 Studio One Forever, documentary film

References

External links 
 

1975 establishments in California
LGBT nightclubs in California
Music venues in Los Angeles
Nightclubs in Los Angeles County, California